Wilfredo "Will" Barahona Euceda (born 31 January 1983 in El Negrito, Yoro Honduras) is a Honduran footballer who currently plays as an attacking or defending right back for Liga Nacional de Honduras club Real España.

Career

Olimpia
Barahona have started playing in his football career with Olimpia. His discipline problems have made him to play in the reserves of the team several times. Even though he can get violent, nobody can deny his great skills when on the field.

On 30 December 2009, Barahona was involved in an incident with a referee, Levi López: in a friendly match against Hispano, when Levi López showed him a second yellow card and being sent off, he didn't like the decision and punched the referee on the upper lip. Eventually he received a 2-month game ban, which effectively make him end the first-leg of the Clausura.

Atlético Choloma
On 7 August 2011, Barahona made his domestic league debut against his previous team, Olimpia in a 2-0 defeat.

In August 2012, Barahona was sent off in one of his first games for new club Real España.

International career
Barahona made his debut for Honduras in an August 2006 friendly match against Venezuela and earned his second and final cap in a September 2006 friendly against El Salvador. He was then called up to participate in the 2014 Copa Centroamericana earning his third cap.

External links

References

1983 births
Living people
People from Yoro Department
Association football defenders
Honduran footballers
Honduras international footballers
C.D. Olimpia players
Atlético Choloma players
Real C.D. España players
Liga Nacional de Fútbol Profesional de Honduras players
2014 Copa Centroamericana players